Stio is a town and comune in the province of Salerno in the Campania region of south-western Italy. As of 2016, its population was 872.

History
The village was founded in the beginnings of the 11th century. The origin of the name is debated, and it has been supposed it could derive from the Latin word Ostium ("entrance"), or others.

Geography
Located in the middle of Cilento, and part of its national park, Stio is a hilltown near the springs of Alento river and the forest area of Pruno. The municipality borders with Campora, Gioi, Laurino, Magliano Vetere and Orria. It counts a single hamlet (frazione), that is the village of Gorga, 3 km far from it and with a population of 160.

The town is composed by the medieval old town and spans, along the national highway SR 488, with two more recent areas: Via Amendola in the west, and Via Mazzini in the east. The upper area, named Piano del Rosario and composed by some scattered houses surrounded by a forest, is located above the village of Gorga.

Demographics

Main sights
St. Paschal Church (18th century), located in the middle of the town
The ancient St. Peter and Paul Church (11th century), located south of the old town.
The Mill Valley, located outside the town.

Personalities
Raffaele Lettieri (1881–1957), politician and academic, born in Gorga
Antonino Maria Stromillo (1786–1858), Catholic bishop, first one of the Diocese of Caltanissetta, born in Gorga

Gallery

Twin towns
 Dingé (France)

See also
Cilentan dialect

References

External links

 Stio official website
 Stio Tipica: history, sights, traditions

Cities and towns in Campania
Localities of Cilento